Royal Ranch is a British teen dramedy Miniseries of the Walt Disney Company, which is produced for Disney Channel UK. The premiere took place on 20 November 2017 in the Disney Channel App in the UK and Ireland.

Plot
Royal Ranch tells the story of Finny, a fun-loving, young girl who can handle horses very well, and lives with her grandmother Anne Marie. When Finny has to sell her beloved horse Lottie, so that her family is not insolvent, she is sad at first. But soon after, her life is turned upside down when Finny accepts King Oswald's offer to teach the warped twins Prince Arthur and Princess Henrietta how to ride. In the beginning, Finny believed she could easily master the challenge, but the twins have all sorts of crazy pranks ready and are very cheeky to Finny. Just as Finny starts to feel comfortable and having fun in San Morania, she comes closer to a family secret. And Finny unexpectedly meets Prince Eugen an ally in the midst of all the madness.

Cast and characters
Mia Jenkins as Finny
 Lucila Gandolfo as Anne Marie
 N.N. as Prince Eugene
 Ivan Espeche as King Oswald
 N.N. as Prince Arthur
 Emma Glinsky as Princess Henrietta
 N.N. as Nadine

Episodes

Broadcast
The full first season was released on the Disney Channel App in the UK and Ireland on 20 November 2017. The individual episodes are also currently available on DisneyLife and on the YouTube channel of Disney Channel UK. In addition, the series is repeated in the British Disney Channel. The miniseries will gradually be released in other countries, including Germany, Italy, Austria, Switzerland and France.

References

External links
 DisneyLife  
 Episodeslist

2010s British children's television series
2017 British television series debuts
2017 British television series endings
Disney Channel (British and Irish TV channel) original programming
English-language television shows